Raa is a 2001 Telugu film starring Upendra and Priyanka Trivedi in the lead roles. The film was directed by K. S. Nageswara Rao, produced by Nallamalupu Bujji and has music composed by Gurukiran.

Cast
 Upendra as Sridhar
 Priyanka Trivedi as Shanthi
 Dhamini
 Sadhu Kokila
 Giri Babu
 Anant
 Tirupati Prakash
 Siva Parvati
 Alphonsa (special appearance in song)

Box office
The film collected a share of 6 Crore. The movie completed 100 days of run in Andhra Pradesh, was released in Karnataka and ran for 75 days in Bangalore. According to the film's producer Nallamalupu Bujji, Raa turned out to be a "minimum guarantee" hit at the box office.

Soundtrack

The film's soundtrack has 5 songs composed by Gurukiran.

 "Pelladuta Rave" -
 "Yemito Yekkado" -
 "Antaru Antha Nannu" -
 "Raa Moham Dwesham" -
 "Ready 1234" -

References

2001 films
2000s Telugu-language films
Films set in Bangalore
Films scored by Gurukiran